Topíssima is a Brazilian telenovela produced by RecordTV and Casablanca that premiered on 21 May 2019 and ended on 9 December 2019. The series is written by Cristianne Fridman and directed by Rudi Lagemann. The series stars Camila Rodrigues, Felipe Cunha, Floriano Peixoto, Cristiana Oliveira, Sílvia Pfeifer, Maurício Mattar, Samara Felippo and Sidney Sampaio.

Plot 
Sophia is a beautiful, elegant, self-confident millionaire woman. A businesswoman ahead of the family empire, Alencar Group, a network of private universities. She served as vice president and will now hold the presidency if she meets a requirement imposed by her mother, Lara, a decadent and egocentric actress, to marry within 1 year. Sophia's combination of money and beauty attracts countless social climbers. She is aware of this and uses them in the same way that she feels used when they approach her for interest. However, she finally discovers love after an unexpected encounter with Antonio, a man of humble origin, that faces difficulties with confidence and optimism. Responsible for the family's support, he works as a taxi driver, as well as helping and managing his mother's restaurant in Morro do Vidigal.

Cast 
 Camila Rodrigues as Sophia Loren Alencar
 Felipe Cunha as Antônio "Toninho" Ramos Gonçalves
 Floriano Peixoto as Paulo Roberto Mendonça
 Felipe Cardoso as Detetive Pedro Almada
 Cristiana Oliveira as Lara Alencar Dominguez
 Sílvia Pfeifer as Marinalva "Mariinha" Ramos Gonçalves
 Sidney Sampaio as Delegado André Medeiros
 Rayanne Morais as Detetive Graça Ribeiro
 Denise Del Vecchio as Madalena Oliveira Soares
 Paulo Cesar Grande as José Carlos "Zeca" Oliveira Soares
 Cássia Linhares as Beatriz Nogueira de Mendonça
 Maurício Mattar as Carlos Dominguez
 Kadu Moliterno as Dagoberto Almada
 Rafaela Sampaio as Gabriela Ramos Gonçalves
 Marcelo Rodrigues Filho as Rafael "Rafa" Nogueira de Mendonça
 Vitor Novello as Vitor Menezes da Silva
 Guilherme Winter as João Fernandes Lima
 Eri Johnson as Detetive Edevaldo Guedes / Pierre
 Bruno Guedes as Edison Gusmão
 Miguel Roncato as Bruno Lopes
 Emílio Orciollo Netto as Taylor Smith
 Juliana Didone as Yasmin Barros 
 Pérola Faria as Angélica Vasconcelos
 Cláudia Mello as Clementina Monteiro
 Bemvindo Sequeira as Adolfo "Canarinho" Constantino
 Suzana Alves as Inês Guedes 
 Isabel Fillardis as Dr. Vera Martins
 Fabio Beltrão as Leonardo "Mão de Vaca" Almada 
 João Villa as Zico "Sem Noção" Martins
 Amanda Richter as Isadora Ferraz
 Marcella Rica as Rebeca "Beca" Moura
 Thais Müller as Minha Flor Vilela
 Marcelo Arnal as Gustavo Torres
 Ingrid Conte as Elisabeth Siqueira
 Felipe Silcler as Milton "Zumbi" Albuquerque
 Letícia Peroni as Andréa Alencar Dominguez
 Guilherme Seta as Fernando Oliveira Soares
 Myrella Victória as Jade Bevilacqua Guimarães
 Karen Marinho as Aderlize Mendes
 Samuel Melo as Eduardo "Edu" Pereira
 César Pezzuoli as Walter
 Marcos Holanda as José
 Anita Amizo as Dr. Cláudia
 Juliana Lucci as Maria Duarte
 Clarissa Marinho as Caetana
 Prisma da Matta as Letícia
 Rodrigo Candelot as Nelson Martins
 Claudio Cinti as Gomes
 Chico Melo as Miguel
 Miguel Salabert as Geraldo
 Samya Peruchi as Creuza

Guest stars 
 Samara Felippo as Thaís Bevilacqua
 Brenda Sabryna as Jandira Oliveira Soares
 Camilla Amado as Zilá da Silva
 Sérgio Menezes as Gonçalo
 Aline Riscado as Luciana Silveira
 Zé Carlos Machado as Valdir Silveira
 Nica Bonfim as Solange Silveira
 Ivan Rios as Caio 
 Gilberto Torres as Dr. Alexandre
 Kauã Rodriguez as Bené
 Fábio Villa Verde as Joaquim Ferraz
 Adriana Prado as Flávia Ferraz
 Simone Soares as Helena Torres
 Solange Damasceno as Mrs. Solange
 Paulo Carvalho as Lara's judge
 Fabrício Assis as Formiga

Ratings

References

External links 
 

2019 telenovelas
2019 Brazilian television series debuts
2019 Brazilian television series endings
Brazilian telenovelas
RecordTV telenovelas
Portuguese-language telenovelas